Bryson (also Rodelia or Kansas City Junction) is an unincorporated community in Pettis County, Missouri, United States.

A variant name was "Rodelia". A post office called Rodelia was established in 1896, and remained in operation until 1914. The identity of namesake Bryson is unknown.

References

Unincorporated communities in Pettis County, Missouri
Unincorporated communities in Missouri